Future Reflections may refer to:

Future Reflections, a quarterly magazine published by National Federation of the Blind
"Future Reflections", a song from the MGMT album Oracular Spectacular